Stroitel Stadium (Russian: Стадион «Строитель») is a bandy arena in Murmansk, Russia. Its audience capacity is 5,000 people. It is the home arena of bandy club Murman Murmansk.

References

Bandy venues in Russia
Sport in Murmansk